The 2011–12 Montenegrin Women's League was the inaugural edition of the competition, which succeeded the FSCG Trophy as the premier women's football championship in Montenegro. It ran from 15 October 2011 to 12 May 2012 and it was contested by six teams. Ekonomist Nikšić won nine out of ten games to win the competition and become the first Montenegrin club to take part in the UEFA Champions League.

Table

See also
Montenegrin Women's League

References

Montenegro
2011 in Montenegrin sport
2012 in Montenegrin sport
Sport in Montenegro